Alajärvi is a town and municipality of Finland. It is located in the South Ostrobothnia region. The town is unilingually Finnish; there are few immigrants.

The municipality of Lehtimäki was consolidated with Alajärvi on 1 January 2009.

Geography
The neighboring municipalities of Alajärvi are Alavus, Kuortane, Kyyjärvi, Lappajärvi, Lapua, Perho, Soini, Vimpeli and Ähtäri.

Villages
In 1967, Alajärvi had eight legally recognized villages (henkikirjakylät):

 Alajärvi
 Kurejoki
 Menkijärvi
 Möksy
 Savonkylä
 Tarvolankylä
 Päällysaho
 Vimpeli

Demographics 
In 2020, 17.4% of the population of Alajärvi was under the age of 15, 54.3% were aged 15 to 64, and 28.3% were over the age of 64. The average age was 46.1, above the national average of 43.4 and regional average of 44.7. Speakers of Finnish made up 96.8% of the population and speakers of Swedish made up 0.1%, while the share of speakers of foreign languages was 3.0%. Foreign nationals made up 2.8% of the total population. 

The chart below, describing the development of the total population of Alajärvi from 1975-2020, encompasses the municipality's area as of 2021.

Urban areas 
In 2019, out of the total population of 9,562, 5,846 people lived in urban areas and 3,641 in sparsely populated areas, while the coordinates of 75 people were unknown. This made Alajärvi's degree of urbanization 61.6%. The urban population in the municipality was divided between three urban areas as follows:

Economy 
In 2018, 11.2% of the workforce of Alajärvi worked in primary production (agriculture, forestry and fishing), 29.9% in secondary production (e.g. manufacturing, construction and infrastructure), and 57.1% in services. In 2019, the unemployment rate was 9.3%, and the share of pensioners in the population was 33.0%. 

Though a small town, Alajärvi has a few shops, namely Supermarket, Tokmanni, Lidl and a few others. In 2013 a public natatorium was opened, which also includes a weight room.

Culture 
The Alajärvi church was designed by Carl Ludvig Engel, and completed in 1836.

The administrative centre and library buildings are based on designs by Alvar Aalto.

The town is home to the Nelimarkka Museum. The museum was built by the painter Eero Nelimarkka. It was designed by his friend, the architect Hilding Ekelund.

Notable people
 Reijo Hongisto
 Martti Korkia-Aho
 Matti Luoma-aho
 Eino Ojajärvi
 Verner Thomé
 Reijo Vähälä
Eero Nelimarkka

Gallery

References

External links
 
Town of Alajärvi – Official website

 
Cities and towns in Finland
Populated places established in 1869
1869 establishments in the Russian Empire